Evelyn Blackwood (born October 2, 1950) is an American anthropologist whose research focuses on gender, sexuality, identity, and kinship. She was  awarded the Ruth Benedict Prize in 1999, 2007 and 2011.  Blackwood is an emerita professor of anthropology  at Purdue University.

Biography 
Blackwood graduated from The King's College, New York with a BA in psychology. She earned an MA in anthropology at San Francisco State University, and a PhD from Stanford University in 1993. Blackwood was an assistant professor at Purdue University from 1994 to 2000, associate professor from 2000 to 2010 and professor from 2010 to 2017. She is currently an emerita professor at the university. Blackwood, a lesbian, works on gender, sexuality, identity and kinship as it relates to different cultural societies in West Sumatra, Indonesia and the United States.

Blackwood was the recipient of a Fulbright Senior Scholarship in 2001 and a 2007 Martin Duberman Fellowship (Center for Lesbian and Gay Studies, City University of New York) for her research on sexuality and identity in Indonesia and Southeast Asia. The research resulted in several publications, including the monograph, Falling into the Lesbi World: Desire and Difference in Indonesia (2010) which won the 2011 Ruth Benedict Prize."

Her current research combines anthropology and history to "explore the construction and negotiation of identity, selfhood, and sexuality among baby boomers in the U.S., focusing on women in the first generation of 'out' lesbians in the San Francisco Bay Area in the 1970s."

Awards
 Ruth Benedict Prize, Female Desires: Same Sex Relations and Transgender Practices Across Cultures, (1999)
 Fulbright Senior Scholarship, (2001)
 Martin Duberman Fellowship, (2007)
 Ruth Benedict Prize,  co-editor, Women’s Sexualities and Masculinities in a Globalizing Asia, (2007)
 Ruth Benedict Prize, Falling into the Lesbi World: Desire and Difference in Indonesia, (2011),

Selected publications

Journals

Books

Anthologies

References 

Living people
American anthropologists
LGBT anthropologists
Lesbian academics
American women anthropologists
Stanford University alumni
Purdue University faculty
San Francisco State University alumni
Year of birth missing (living people)
American women academics
21st-century American women